Uglješa Kojadinović (14 February 1936 – 20 June 1982) was a Yugoslav actor of Serb origin.

Early life and education
Kojadinović was of Serb ethnicity,  born in the village of Glamočani near Bardaca Lake and Srbac in what is now Bosnia and Herzegovina (then Kingdom of Yugoslavia). After graduating from acting schools in Glamocani and Banja Luka, he enrolled at the Drama Academy in Zagreb, where he graduated in the class of Professor Branko Gavella.

Career
Kojadinović's acting gained in popularity by playing at the theater: Molière's Le Bourgeois gentilhomme, Fyodor Dostoyevsky's Demons, William Shakespeare's Hamnet as Horatio.

Kojadinović preferred theater, but became known for his many roles in TV series and movies: Black Birds, Doctor Mladen, The Pine Tree in the Mountain, Kaya, and others.

Selected filmography

See also

List of Yugoslavian films
List of Serbs
List of Serbian actors
List of Serbian films
List of Croatian films
Republic of Srpska

External links
 
 

1936 births
1982 deaths
Yugoslav male stage actors
Serbs of Bosnia and Herzegovina
Academy of Dramatic Art, University of Zagreb alumni
Deaths from pancreatic cancer
Yugoslav male television actors